Yuri Nikolayevich Klinskikh (July 27, 1964 – July 4, 2000) was a Russian musician, singer, songwriter, arranger, and founder of the rock band Sektor Gaza. He was also known as Yuri "Khoy".

Biography 
From 1982 to 1984, Klinskikh served in the Soviet Army in the Far East. From 1984 to 1986, he worked in the traffic police, and then as a milling-machine operator in a factory. He started writing songs as a hobby in his early school years . He began performing in 1987. In 1988, he founded the band Sektor Gaza.

On July 4, 2000, Klinskikh reportedly  felt severe chest and stomach pain, but chose not to cancel a meeting later that day to film a music video for the song "Noch Straha" ("Night of Fear"). He died that day, at the age of 35, in Voronezh. Although it was rumored that he died due to either heart failure or Hepatitis C caused by severe alcohol and possibly drug abuse, the exact cause of his death remains unknown since an official investigation was never carried out. He is buried on the Levoberezhniy cemetery of Voronezh.

Discography

Solo album 
1981—1985 — Акустический альбом (Acoustic album)

Sektor Gaza

Demo albums 
 1989 — Плуги-вуги (Plows-woogie)
 1989 — Колхозный панк (Kolkhoz Punk)

Formal albums  
 1990 — Зловещие мертвецы (The Evil Dead)
 1990 — Ядрёна вошь (Vigorous Louse)
 1991 — Ночь перед Рождеством (The Night before Christmas)
 1991 — Колхозный панк (Kolkhoz Punk)
 1992 — Гуляй, мужик! (Make Merry, Man!)
 1993 — Нажми на газ (Hit The Gas)
 1993 — Сектор газа (Sector of Gas)
 1994 — Танцы после порева (Dancing after Sex)
 1994 — Кащей Бессмертный (Kashchey The Immortal)
 1996 — Газовая атака (Gas Attack)
 1997 — Наркологический университет миллионов (Narcological University for Millions)
 1997 — Сектор газа (Sector of Gas) [Re-recording]
 2000 — Восставший из Ада (Hellraiser)

Remix album 
 1999 — Extasy — Techno-style remixes by Aleksey Bryantsev (DJ Krot)
 1999 — Extasy 2 — Techno-style remixes by Aleksey Bryantsev (DJ Krot)

References

Further reading 
 Tikhomirov, Vladimir (2001). "Khoi!": Epitafiya rok-razolbayu, Moscow: Antao. .
 Gnoevoy, Roman (2004). Sektor Gaza glazami blizkikh, Moscow: Antao. .
 Alekseyev, Aleksandr (2009). .  (AST),   (Astrel),   (Kharvest).

External links
 Official website.
 Official Voronezh site.

1964 births
2000 deaths
People from Voronezh
Russian punk rock musicians
Russian rock singers
20th-century Russian singers
20th-century Russian male singers